Déjeuner (French: luncheon or in Canada: breakfast) may refer to:

Le Déjeuner en fourrure, nickname for Object, 1936 surrealist sculpture by Méret Oppenheim
Le déjeuner sur l'herbe 1862/3 painting by Édouard Manet
Le Déjeuner des Canotiers 1881 painting by Pierre-Auguste Renoir